This is a list of Norwegian television related events from 1986.

Events
15 April - British children's television series Thomas The Tank Engine & Friends premieres on Norwegian television on NRK making Norway the very first country outside its homeland to translate the series into a different language.
3 May - The 31st Eurovision Song Contest is held at the Grieghallen in Bergen. Belgium wins the contest with the song "J'aime la vie", performed by 13-year-old Sandra Kim.

Debuts

International
15 April -  Thomas The Tank Engine & Friends (NRK)

Television shows

Ending this year

Births

Deaths

See also
1986 in Norway